Nicole Provis and Elna Reinach won in the final 4–6, 6–4, 6–2 against Raffaella Reggi and Arantxa Sánchez Vicario.

Seeds
Champion seeds are indicated in bold text while text in italics indicates the round in which those seeds were eliminated.

 Elizabeth Smylie /  Wendy Turnbull (first round)
 Katrina Adams /  Elise Burgin (first round)
 Jenny Byrne /  Janine Tremelling (first round)
 Nicole Provis /  Elna Reinach (champions)

Draw

External links
 1989 Virginia Slims of Albuquerque Doubles Draw

Virginia Slims of Albuquerque
1989 WTA Tour